Wake of the Flood is the sixth studio album (tenth overall) by rock band the Grateful Dead. Released October 15, 1973, it was the first album on the band's own Grateful Dead Records label. Their first studio album in nearly three years, it was also the first without founding member Ron "Pigpen" McKernan, who had recently died. His absence and keyboardist Keith Godchaux's penchants for bebop and modal jazz (rather than McKernan's tendencies toward the blues and rhythm and blues) contributed to the band's musical evolution. Godchaux's wife, backing vocalist Donna Jean Godchaux, also joined the group and appears on the album.

The release fared better on the pop charts than their previous studio album (1970's American Beauty), reaching  18. An expanded version was released in 2004.

Recording
After three (official) live albums in a row, the Grateful Dead wanted to record studio versions of songs written since Keith Godchaux had joined the band. At the time of recording, five of the songs on the album (and part of a 6th) had been in live rotation for up to a year and a half, as arrangements were road-tested and finalized. Referring to this period, bassist Phil Lesh explained, "We'd learned to break in the material at shows (under fire, as it were), rather than try to work it out at rehearsals, or in the studio at tremendous expense."

The new compositions drew on many of the band's influences, blending genres from country folk and R&B to ragtime and jazz rock, the latter being more prominent than previously. As had become routine, Robert Hunter and Jerry Garcia wrote the majority of the songs, with Bob Weir's contribution being the epic "Weather Report Suite". The "Prelude" section of this piece had been developed onstage, but the "Part 1" and "Part 2 (Let it Grow)" debuted after the album's recording. "Let Me Sing Your Blues Away" is the band's only singing-songwriting contribution from Keith Godchaux. It was performed live just six times, in September 1973, between the recording and release of the album.

Describing Godchaux's influence, drummer Bill Kreutzmann characterized the album as "Keith's coming out party." Remarking on the evolution in style, he remembered:

The band chose to record at the recently built Record Plant between August 4–15, 1973. It was in Sausalito, near their San Rafael home base, and had been used by cohorts New Riders of the Purple Sage for their successful album The Adventures of Panama Red (which featured input from Hunter and Donna Godchaux). Staff engineer Tom Flye, assistant engineer Tom Anderson, and Dead soundman Dan Healy recorded and mixed on 24-track, bringing the mixdown to Lacquer Channel in Sausalito for mastering. The initial vinyl runs were pressed by Monarch Record Mfg., in Los Angeles.

Release
The album title comes from the opening stanza of "Here Comes Sunshine":

Wake of the flood, laughing water, '49Get out the pans, don't just stand there dreaming, get out the way,

a poetic reference to the  historic flood in Vanport, Oregon (a site where the Dead would play in 1995). Though lyrically the songs continued Hunter's Americana themes, a thread of Earth, seasons and life cycles connects the material, particularly with Weir and Barlow's culminating suite. This is represented in the album cover artwork, designed by San Francisco counterculture artist and band associate Rick Griffin. It has an Earth tone and simple graphics including a woodcut-derived figure of a harvest-reaping man with a wheat bundle and scythe, and a field crow. Reflecting the cycles of nature is an image, hidden in a cloud, of a hooded skull. Griffin said that the artwork was inspired by a quote from Revelation – "And the sea gave up the dead that were in it and death and Hell gave up the dead that were in them, and they were judged, every man according to their works." (Revelation 20:13)  He added that the image was designed "to show an alternative to that. I wanted to juxtapose that Scripture with a loving image, an image of loving harvest." (The list of song titles on the back cover is missing from some early pressings.)

After completing their extended contract and extracting themselves from Warner Bros., the Dead were left without a record label for production and distribution of their albums. The decision was made to start an independent label, in order to retain complete control of their recordings and allow for side-projects. Lesh explained, "We already owned our own sound system. Booking and travel were in-house. It seemed as if being our own record company would be worth a try. No one could see a downside." Though pressing their own records was foreseeable, setting up a distribution network to compete with existing channels was formidable and ultimately short-lived. Lesh continued, "How would we distribute the records? [Manager Ron] Rakow's original scam was to sell the records from ice-cream trucks...seriously impractical. In the end, we settled on a more traditional model: the Dead would finance and produce the recordings, and United Artists Records would manufacture and distribute."

Two singles were released: "Let Me Sing Your Blues Away (b/w "Here Comes Sunshine"), followed by single edits of "Eyes of the World" (b/w "Weather Report Part I"). Neither charted. The Dead's ex-label responded to the loss of the band by compiling "best-of" and archive albums, beginning with Skeletons from the Closet, just months after the release of Wake of the Flood.

All of the songs but "Let Me Sing Your Blues Away" and the first parts of "Weather Report Suite" remained in setlists throughout the existence of the band (though "Here Comes Sunshine" was absent from 2/23/74 to December 1992). Weir had played the finger-picked "Prelude" for months before attaching it to "Weather Report Suite", ultimately dropping all but the "Let it Grow" section after 1974. Though the album's version is concise, "Eyes of the World" in particular had already become an extended-jam set piece and would remain so.

With the collapse of the band's label in 1976, Wake of the Flood was in and out of print for many years. Exercising an active contract, United Artists made a one-off pressing on their Liberty label in 1979. The album went back into publication when it was released on CD in 1988, again on the Grateful Dead Records imprint. It was remastered and expanded for inclusion in the Beyond Description box set in October 2004. The expanded version was released separately in 2006.

Track listing

Notes:

Live version of "Eyes of the World" is an edited version of performance.
"China Doll" has a coda of "The Merry-Go-Round Broke Down", written by Cliff Friend and Dave Franklin.

Personnel

Grateful Dead
Jerry Garcia – guitar, pedal steel guitar, vocals
Donna Jean Godchaux – vocals
Keith Godchaux – keyboards, vocals
Phil Lesh – bass guitar
Bill Kreutzmann – drums
Bob Weir – guitar, vocals

Additional musicians
Bill Atwood – trumpet
Vassar Clements – violin
Joe Ellis – trumpet
Martín Fierro – saxophone (alto, tenor)
Sarah Fulcher – vocals
Matthew Kelly – harmonica
Frank Morin – saxophone (tenor)
Pat O'Hara – trombone
Doug Sahm – bajo sexto
Benny Velarde – timbales

Reissue personnel
Tom Anderson – engineering, liner notes
James Austin – production
Hugh Brown – design, art direction
Reggie Collins – annotation
Peter Coyote – liner notes
Jimmy Edwards – associate production
Sheryl Farber – editorial supervision
Tom Flye – mixing
Joe Gastwirt – mastering, production consultancy
Dan Healy – engineering
Robin Hurley – associate production
David Lemieux – production
Hale Milgrim – associate production
Scott Pascucci – associate production
Ed Perlstein – photography
Bruce Polonsky – photography
Michael Putland – photography
Cameron Sears – executive production
Steve Vance – design, art direction

Charts
Billboard

References

1973 albums
Arista Records albums
Grateful Dead albums
Grateful Dead Records albums
Rhino Records albums
Albums with cover art by Rick Griffin